Mathieu Dourthe (born 22 July 1976 in Dax, France) is a French rugby union player whose usual position is at a fullback. Prior to joining Section Paloise, he played for US Dax and SU Agen Lot-et-Garonne. He earned his only cap for France on 18 November 2000 against All Blacks.

References

External links

1976 births
Living people
French rugby union players
France international rugby union players
Rugby union fullbacks